Santo Antônio de Jesus is a city in the eastern part of the state of Bahia, Brazil, located west of the state capital Salvador. It is part of the mesoregion Metropolitana de Salvador. The population is 102,380 (2020 est.) in an area of 261.35 km². It is an important commercial and a service centre in the micro-region.

Neighboring municipalities

Aratuípe
Laje
São Miguel das Matas
Varzedo

Population history

Notable people

Notable people include Júnior, a five-time champion for the Brazil national football team of football (soccer).

References

External links
 http://www.citybrazil.com.br/ba/stoantoniojesus/

Municipalities in Bahia